Troy Stark (January 2, 1973 – June 1, 2001) was an American football offensive lineman. He was signed by the Green Bay Packers as an undrafted free agent in 1996. He was traded to the New York Jets during training camp and was released during training camp in 1997. He also played for the New York/New Jersey Hitmen of the XFL in 2001. He played in college at the University of Georgia. Stark died on June 1, 2001, due to complications from a blood clot following knee surgery. The blood clot was thought to have jarred loose during intense physical therapy and it then travelled to his lungs.

References

External links
Troy Stark in Memoriam

1973 births
2001 deaths
American football offensive linemen
Green Bay Packers players
New York Jets players
Georgia Bulldogs football players
New York/New Jersey Hitmen players
People from Canandaigua, New York